SN 1006 was a supernova that is likely the brightest observed stellar event in recorded history, reaching an estimated −7.5 visual magnitude, and exceeding roughly sixteen times the brightness of Venus. Appearing between April 30 and May 1, 1006, in the constellation of Lupus, this "guest star" was described by observers across China, Japan, modern-day Iraq, Egypt, and Europe, and was possibly recorded in North American petroglyphs. Some reports state it was clearly visible in the daytime. Modern astronomers now consider its distance from Earth to be about 2,200 parsecs.

Historic reports
Egyptian astrologer and astronomer Ali ibn Ridwan, writing in a commentary on Ptolemy's Tetrabiblos, stated that the "spectacle was a large circular body, 2 to 3 times as large as Venus. The sky was shining because of its light. The intensity of its light was a little more than a quarter that of Moon light" (or perhaps "than the light of the Moon when one-quarter illuminated").
Like all other observers, Ali ibn Ridwan noted that the new star was low on the southern horizon. Some astrologers interpreted the event as a portent of plague and famine.

The most northerly sighting is recorded in the annals of the Abbey of Saint Gall in Switzerland, at a latitude of 47.5° North.
Monks at St. Gall provide independent data as to its magnitude and location in the sky, writing that
 "[i]n a wonderful manner this was sometimes contracted, sometimes diffused, and moreover sometimes extinguished ... It was seen likewise for three months in the inmost limits of the south, beyond all the constellations which are seen in the sky".
This description is often taken as probable evidence that the supernova was of type Ia.

In The Book of Healing, Iranian philosopher Avicenna reported observing this supernova from northeastern Iran. He reported it as a transient celestial object which was stationary and/or tail-less (a star among the stars), that it remained for close to 3 months getting fainter and fainter until it disappeared, that it threw out sparks, that is, it was scintillating and very bright, and that the color changed with time.

Some sources state that the star was bright enough to cast shadows; it was certainly seen during daylight hours for some time.

According to Songshi, the official history of the Song Dynasty (sections 56 and 461), the star seen on May 1, 1006, appeared to the south of constellation Di, between Lupus and Centaurus. It shone so brightly that objects on the ground could be seen at night.

By December, it was again sighted in the constellation Di. The Chinese astrologer Zhou Keming, who was on his return to Kaifeng from his duty in Guangdong, interpreted the star to the emperor on May 30 as an auspicious star, yellow in color and brilliant in its brightness, that would bring great prosperity to the state over which it appeared. The reported color yellow should be taken with some suspicion however, because Zhou may have chosen a favorable color for political reasons.

There appear to have been two distinct phases in the early evolution of this supernova. There was first a three-month period at which it was at its brightest; after this period it diminished, then returned for a period of about eighteen months.

A petroglyph by the Hohokam in White Tank Mountain Regional Park, Arizona, has been interpreted as the first known North American representation of the supernova, though other researchers remain skeptical.

Earlier observations discovered from Yemen may have seen SN 1006 on April 17, two weeks before its previously assumed earliest observation.

Remnant

SN 1006's associated supernova remnant from this event was not identified until 1965, when Doug Milne and Frank Gardner used the Parkes radio telescope to demonstrate a connection to known radio source PKS 1459−41.
This is located near the star Beta Lupi, displaying a 30 arcmin circular shell.
X-ray and optical emission from this remnant have also been detected, and during 2010 the H.E.S.S. gamma-ray observatory announced the detection of very-high-energy gamma-ray emission from the remnant.
No associated neutron star or black hole has been found, which is the situation expected for the remnant of a Type Ia supernova (a class of explosion believed to completely disrupt its progenitor star).
A survey in 2012 to find any surviving companions of the SN 1006 progenitor found no subgiant or giant companion stars,
indicating that SN 1006 most likely had double degenerate progenitors; that is, the merging of two white dwarf stars.

Remnant SNR G327.6+14.6 has an estimated distance of 2.2 kpc from Earth, making the true linear diameter approximately 20 parsecs.

Effect on Earth

Research has suggested that type Ia supernovae can irradiate the Earth with significant amounts of gamma-ray flux, compared with the typical flux from the Sun, up to distances on the order of 1 kiloparsec. SN 1006 lies well beyond 1 kiloparsec, and it did not appear to have significant effects on Earth. However, a signal of its outburst can be found in nitrate deposits in Antarctic ice.

See also
 History of supernova observation
 List of supernova candidates
 List of supernova remnants
 List of supernovae

References

External links

Cause of Supernova SN 1006 Revealed (27 Sept 2012 @ Universitat de Barcelona)
Stories of SN 1006 in Chinese literature (PowerPoint)
National Optical Observatory Press Release for March 2003 
Simulation of SN 1006 as it appeared in the southern sky at midnight, May 1, 1006
Entry for supernova remnant of SN 1006 from the Galactic Supernova Remnant Catalogue
X-ray image of supernova remnant of SN 1006, as seen with the Chandra X-ray Observatory
Ancient rock art may depict exploding star
Astronomy Picture of the Day (APOD), March 17, 2003
Astronomy Picture of the Day (APOD), July 4, 2008
Margaret Donsbach: ''The Scholar's Supernova

Lupus (constellation)
Supernova remnants
11th-century natural events
1006
06
06
Historical supernovae